Nick Lamb may refer to:
 Nick Lamb (sculptor)
 Nick Lamb (cricketer)

See also
 Nic Lamb, American surfer, actor, and entrepreneur